Cristian Javier Nasuti (born 6 September 1982) is a retired Argentine footballer who played as a centre-back.

Career
Nasuti started his career with Platense in the Argentine Primera B Nacional (Second Division) in 2001. He was spotted by River Plate and signed for the club in 2003. On November 30 of that year, Nasuti made his official debut in the Argentine Primera División in a road game against Lanús. The defender scored the equalizer in the last minutes of the 2004 Copa Libertadores semifinals against Boca Juniors, although his team ended up losing the series on penalties. Weeks later, he won with River the 2004 Clausura.

Later, Nasuti moved to Mexico on loan to play for Monarcas Morelia between 2005 and 2006, but returned to River after making 50 appearances for Morelia. In the winter of 2008, he transferred to Banfield where he made 29 appearances in Primera.

After a successful season in Greece with Aris, Nasuti stayed in the Greek Super League for one more year, signing a one-year loan deal with AEK Athens.

The defender went on to play for Libertad (Paraguay), Emelec (Ecuador) and Deportivo Cali (Colombia), winning first division titles with the latter two.

In 2016, Nasuti returned to Argentina to play for Vélez Sarsfield. He scored his first goal in a 2–1 victory against Olimpo for the second fixture of the 2016 Argentine Primera División.

Honours
River Plate
Argentine Primera División: 2004 Clausura, 2008 Clausura
AEK Athens
Greek Cup: 2010–11
Emelec
Ecuadorian Serie A: 2013, 2014
Deportivo Cali
Categoría Primera A: 2015 Apertura

References

External links
 
 
 

1982 births
Living people
People from San Martín, Buenos Aires
Argentine footballers
Argentine expatriate footballers
Association football defenders
Club Atlético Platense footballers
Club Atlético River Plate footballers
Club Atlético Banfield footballers
Atlético Morelia players
Aris Thessaloniki F.C. players
AEK Athens F.C. players
Club Libertad footballers
C.S. Emelec footballers
Deportivo Cali footballers
Club Atlético Vélez Sarsfield footballers
Olimpo footballers
Lorca FC players
Super League Greece players
Argentine Primera División players
Liga MX players
Categoría Primera A players
Ecuadorian Serie A players
Paraguayan Primera División players
Segunda División players
Argentine expatriate sportspeople in Greece
Argentine expatriate sportspeople in Mexico
Argentine expatriate sportspeople in Colombia
Argentine expatriate sportspeople in Ecuador
Argentine expatriate sportspeople in Paraguay
Argentine expatriate sportspeople in Spain
Expatriate footballers in Greece
Expatriate footballers in Mexico
Expatriate footballers in Colombia
Expatriate footballers in Ecuador
Expatriate footballers in Paraguay
Expatriate footballers in Spain
Sportspeople from Buenos Aires Province